Calyptaulax (Cooper, 1930) is a genus of trilobites in the order Phacopida that existed during the middle and upper Ordovician in what is now the U.S. states of New York, Oklahoma, Illinois, Missouri, Virginia, Vermont, Nevada, Iowa, Wisconsin, Kentucky, and Iowa, as well as the Canadian provinces of Ontario, Newfoundland and Labrador, Quebec, and the territory of Nunavut. Other countries Calyptaulax fossils are known from include Ireland, Norway, Russia, and the United Kingdom.

Type species
By original designation; Calyptaulax glabella Cooper, 1930: pp. 388 - 389, pl. 5, figs. 9 - 11. From the Matapedia Group (Ashgill), Perce, Quebec, Canada.

Other species
 Calyptaulax annulata Raymond, 1905
 Calyptaulax callicephala Hall, 1847
 Calyptaulax callirachis Cooper, 1953
 Calyptaulax cornwalli Ross, Jr. and Barnes, 1967
 Calyptaulax holstonensis Raymond, 1925
 Calyptaulax incepta Whittington, 1965
 Calyptaulax norvegicus Stormer, 1945
 Calyptaulax sillimani Roy, 1941
 Calyptaulax strasburgensis Ulrich and Delo, 1940

References

External links
 Calyptaulax at the Paleobiology Database

Pterygometopidae
Phacopida genera
Fossil taxa described in 1930
Ordovician trilobites of North America
Fossils of Canada
Paleontology in Quebec
Paleozoic life of Ontario
Verulam Formation
Paleozoic life of Newfoundland and Labrador
Paleozoic life of the Northwest Territories
Paleozoic life of Nunavut
Paleozoic life of Quebec